NFPW may stand for:

 National Federation of Press Women, an American professional organization
 National Federation of Professional Workers, a former British trade union federation